The Writers' War Board was the main domestic propaganda organization in the United States during World War II.  Privately organized and run, it coordinated American writers with government and quasi-government agencies that needed written work to help win the war. It was established in 1942 by author Rex Stout at the request of the United States Department of the Treasury.

Background
Due to the public skepticism of propaganda due to the heavy-handed efforts of the Committee on Public Information in the US during World War I, and the fascist regimes' propaganda machinery, the U.S. had adopted a "strategy of truth" whereby they would disseminate information but not try to influence the public directly through propaganda. However, seeing the value and need of propaganda, ways were found to circumvent official policy.

The Writers' War Board began its work December 9, 1941, two days after Pearl Harbor, with a speech by author Rex Stout. The civilian organization was formed at the request of Julian Street Jr., head of the writing staff for the U.S. Treasury Department. Street spoke with playwright Howard Lindsay about organizing a group of prominent writers to promote the sale of war bonds. Lindsay spoke with his writing partner, Russel Crouse, and they approached Authors League president Rex Stout, who they felt should lead the group. On January 6, 1942, Stout met with Crouse, Pearl S. Buck, Clifton Fadiman, Oscar Hammerstein II and John P. Marquand, and the Writers' War Committee was formed. The organization soon grew beyond its modest founding mission and it was renamed the Writers' War Board.

Purposes
Initially part of the Section of Volunteer Talents of the Office of Civilian Defense, the  Writers' War Board worked through the Office of War Information. Its services were available to all branches of the U.S. government and authorized non-government entities. These quasi-government agencies included the American Red Cross, American Theatre Wing, Army Emergency Relief, Canadian Broadcasting Corporation and United Service Organizations. U.S. government funds subsidized the Writers' War Board offices and clerical staff, but the organization's members were not paid and were free to act independently of government sponsorship.

Its purposes were outlined in its first annual report:

 Serve as liaison between American writers and U.S. government agencies seeking written work that will directly or indirectly help win the war; and place ideas or work submitted to the board with appropriate government agencies. Examples include fiction, articles and songs; radio material for broadcast; speeches and style manuals; scripts for troop shows; radio broadcasts and personal appearances by writers.
 Serve other accredited agencies in the same capacity.
 Initiate and administer enterprises to advance the war effort including creation of radio dramas and efforts to strengthen the embryonic United Nations.

The board processed numerous requests from government departments, assigned work to writers, and negotiated more complex requests. When their writing was used in government publications or on the radio, writers donated their work to the war effort. If the material was used in commercial publications the writers were offered compensation at the customary rates, but many donated a portion of their efforts.

In its first year the Writers' War Board mobilized 2,000 professional writers and produced over 8,000 stories, radio scripts, ideas, slogans, poems, dramatic skits and books.

Role
Although it was a civilian organization, the Writers' War Board was established expressly to promote government policy and received government funding.  Originally intended to promote the sales of war bonds, it soon grew into a liaison office between writers and the government. They both responded to official requests and initiated their own campaigns. Many of the writers involved regarded their work as quicker and bolder than governmental efforts.  The board compiled files on 4,000 writers, with their regions and fields of expertise.

It worked, according to an employee, as "an arm of the government". And the activities were so extensive that it has been called the "greatest propaganda machine in history".

After Congress restricted the activities of the domestic branch of the Office of War Information in mid-1943, the role and importance of the Writers' War Board increased significantly.

From 1944 until 1948 prominent U.S. policy makers launched a domestic propaganda campaign aimed at convincing the public to agree to a harsh peace for the German people, for example by removing the common view of the German people and the Nazi party as separate entities. The core in this campaign was the Writers' War Board, which was closely associated with the Roosevelt administration. Writers' War Board chairman Rex Stout also led the Society for the Prevention of World War III.

Membership
Rex Stout served as chairman of the Writers' War Board; Frederica Barach was liaison officer for the Office of War Information and executive secretary. Members of the inaugural board and advisory council are listed in the organization's first annual report.

Board

 Franklin P. Adams
 Sidney Buchman
 George Britt
 Pearl S. Buck
 Henry Fisk Carlton
 Carl Carmer
 Robert T. Colwell
 Russel Crouse
 Elmer Davis
 Samuel Eubanks
 Clifton Fadiman
 Paul Gallico
 Jack Goodman
 Rita Halle Kleeman
 Robert J. Landry
 Margaret Leech
 John P. Marquand
 Katharine Seymour
 William L. Shirer
 Luise Sillcox

Advisory Council

 Louis Adamic
 Faith Baldwin
 Margaret Culkin Banning
 Stephen Vincent Benét
 Roark Bradford
 Louis Bromfield
 Van Wyck Brooks
 Katharine Brush
 Henry Seidel Canby
 Mary Ellen Chase
 Marc Connelly
 Norman Corwin
 Walter D. Edmonds
 Edna Ferber
 Dorothy Canfield Fisher
 Corey Ford
 Rose Franken
 Lewis Gannett
 John Gunther
 Langston Hughes
 Fannie Hurst
 Marquis James
 Owen Johnson
 John F. Kieran
 Manuel Komroff
 Howard Lindsay
 Edna St. Vincent Millay
 Edward R. Murrow
 Robert Nathan
 Clifford Odets
 Eugene O'Neill
 William Lyon Phelps
 Fletcher Pratt
 Marjorie Kinnan Rawlings
 Quentin Reynolds
 Elmer Rice
 Mary Roberts Rinehart
 Kenneth Roberts
 Frank Sullivan
 Dorothy Thompson
 Carl Van Doren
 Hendrik Willem van Loon
 Walter White
 Thornton Wilder

Activities
The Writers' War Board was organized into specialized groups including the following:

 Army Committee
 Brief Items Committee
 Civilian Programs Committee
 Foreign Writers Committee
 High School Contest Committee,
 Juvenile Writers Committee,
 Library Committee
 Lidice Committee
 Lists Committee
 Lunchtime Follies Committee (with the American Theatre Wing)
 Maritime Commission Committee
 May 10—Book Burning Committee
 Overseas Broadcasts Committee
 Poster Committee
 Pulp Writers Committee
 Radio Committee
 Scripts for Soldier and Sailor Shows Committee
 Speech Writers Committee
 Star-Spangled Banner Committee
 Syndicate Committee
 Treasury Half-Hour Show Committee
 U.S.O. Committee
 U.S.O. Camp Shows Committee
 V-Homes Committee
 War Page Committee
 War Scripts of the Month Committee
 Writers' War Board Radio Talks

The Writers' War Board compiled lists of books banned or burned in Nazi Germany May 10, 1933, and distributed them for propaganda purposes, which aided in the staging of thousands of commemorations of the book burnings. In cooperation with the Council on Books in Wartime, the board's May 10—Book Burning Committee, chaired by publisher Bennett Cerf, coordinated a national commemoration of the ninth anniversary of the book burning in Nazi Germany. A script written for the occasion was presented nationally on NBC radio, and a second script for local use was distributed to 210 radio stations; both scripts were used throughout the war.

See also
Our Secret Weapon
Society for the Prevention of World War III
United States Office of War Information
American propaganda during World War II
Propaganda in the United States
Council on Books in Wartime

References

External links
 Writers' War Board records at the Library of Congress
The Writers' War Board
Methods of the Writers' War Board
Influence of the Writers' War Board

Government agencies established in 1941
United States government propaganda organizations
Politics of World War II
Agencies of the United States government during World War II
Rex Stout
American propaganda during World War II